The Sikorsky S-4 was a Russian aircraft built by Igor Sikorsky using many components of the S-3 including the  Anzani three-cylinder engine. Construction of the biplane began in late December 1910 and was completed early in the spring of 1911. The machine appeared in a static display at an aeronautical exhibition at Kharkov in the spring of 1911, but was never flown. Some time afterward it was disassembled.

Specifications

References

S-4
Biplanes